Barnes Creek is a stream in Wayne County in the U.S. state of Missouri. It is a tributary of Bear Creek.

The stream headwaters arise in northeastern Wayne County north of Missouri Route P (at ) and the stream flows generally north to its confluence with Bear Creek just northeast of the community of Lowndes adjacent to Missouri Route E (at ).

Barnes Creek, historically called "Barnes Fork", has the name of Clayburn Barnes, the original owner of the site.

See also
List of rivers of Missouri

References

Rivers of Wayne County, Missouri
Rivers of Missouri